The Society of Technical Civil Servants (STCS) was a trade union representing draughtspeople in the civil service of the United Kingdom.

The union was founded in 1907 as the Admiralty Draughtsmen's Association, under the leadership of George Chase.  In 1948, it briefly took the name of the Admiralty Technical Association, but later in the year it was joined by the Society of Post Office Engineering Draughtsmen and the Association of Civil Service Designers and Draughtsmen, and became known as the "Society of Technical Civil Servants".

By 1969, the union had a membership of 9,180 people, when it merged into the Institution of Professional Civil Servants.

General Secretaries
1940s: L. B. Whiteman
1949: Cyril Cooper

References

External links
Catalogue of the STCS archives, held at the Modern Records Centre, University of Warwick

Trade unions established in 1907
1969 disestablishments in the United Kingdom
1907 establishments in the United Kingdom
Trade unions disestablished in 1969
Civil service trade unions
Defunct trade unions of the United Kingdom